China's salami slicing is a strategy by which the government of China uses small provocations, none of which would constitute a casus belli by itself, but cumulatively produce a much larger action or result in China's favor which would have been difficult or unlawful to perform all at once.

In 1996, a United States Institute of Peace report on the territorial disputes in the South China Sea wrote, "[…] analysts point to Chinese "salami tactics," in which China is said to test the other claimants through aggressive actions, then back off when it meets significant resistance."

The term "salami slice strategy" has been used to describe policies that incrementally improve China's foreign policy position. Advocates of the term have cited examples such as the alleged String of Pearls strategy in the Indian Ocean as manifestations of the strategy. The term has also been compared to cabbage tactics, which involve swarming a maritime target with large numbers of boats.

Strategy

Modus operandi 
The strategy is often described as covering many domains, including combining soft and hard power for coercive diplomacy, territorial claims on neighboring nations, economic coercion through so-called debt-trap diplomacy, technological acquisition through lawful and unlawful means, and lobbying and influence operations in foreign nations and in international organisations like the World Health Organization, with a view to change their organizational culture to one that is advantageous to China. Salami Slicing has been compared to fifth and sixth generation warfare.

According to Brahma Chellaney, China slices very thinly in a "disaggregating" manner by camouflaging offense as defense, which eventually leads cumulatively to large strategic gains and advantage for China. This throws its targets off balance by undercutting targets' deterrence, and presenting the targets a Hobson’s choice: either silently suffering China's salami slicing, or risking an expensive and dangerous war with China. This strategy also functions to place the blame and burden of starting the war on the targets. 

According to Chellaney, "salami slicing" rather than overt aggression is China's favored strategy to gain strategic advantage through "steady progression of small actions, none of which serves as a casus belli by itself, yet which over time lead cumulatively to a strategic transformation in China’s favor. China’s strategy aims to seriously limit the options of the targeted countries by confounding their deterrence plans and making it difficult for them to devise proportionate or effective counteractions."

Benefits accrued by China 

Chellaney has claimed that China uses salami slicing tactics to control the Indian-claimed Kashmiri territory of Aksai Chin, during the 1950s and 1960s, and to acquire the Paracel Islands in 1974 with marine area of 15,000 square kilometres, Johnson Reef in 1988 from Philippines and Vietnam, Mischief Reef in 1995 from Philippines and Taiwan, and Scarborough Shoal in 2012 from Philippines.

Dimensions of Chinese salami slicing 

Proponents of the salami slicing strategy allege that China has used techniques including exercise of soft and hard power, territorial claims, economic inducements, and foreign intelligence activities to advance Chinese national interests.

Power and control  
China is alleged by Indian sources to use both soft and hard power including "coercive diplomacy, cartographic aggression, saber-rattling, gunboat diplomacy, population-control measures, loans, project funding leading to debt traps, educational programs and incentives". India claims that Chinese activities in Tibet, Hong Kong, Xinjiang, as well as supporting friendly states in North Korea and Pakistan constitute examples of the use of hard and soft power.

Territorial claims 

Indian authors accuse China of using piecemeal territorial claims to expand its territory. Chellaney has cited the incorporation of Aksai Chin into China in a stealthy step-by-step process between 1952 and 1964 as an example of salami slicing. Its recent aggression against India, he terms a "new dangerous phase", where China brazenly seized border areas under another country's control backed by tens of thousands of troops stationed in the rear. Tazikistan's Pamir Mountains, Mount Everest on Nepal–China border, Bhutan's eastern region which shares a border only with India are cited as more such examples.

South China Sea 

Brahma Chellaney alleges that China uses territorial claims in South China Sea to expand its Exclusive economic zone (EEZ) at the expense of other nations EEZ through its Nine-dash line claims, and that China's defense of these claims by installing and deploying military infrastructure constitute territorial expansionism. China deployed its paramilitary agencies, China Maritime Safety Administration, Fisheries Law Enforcement Command and State Oceanic Administration to advance its claims in the region.

Debt diplomacy 

Some critics have claimed that the Belt and Road Initiative (BRI) has pushed Papua New Guinea, Sri Lanka, Kenya, Djibouti, Egypt, Ethiopia and other nations have forced these countries, unable to pay their debts, to handover their infrastructure and resources to China. According to Chellaney, this is "clearly part of China's geostrategic vision". China's overseas development policy has been called debt-trap diplomacy because once indebted economies fail to service their loans, they are said to be pressured to support China's geostrategic interests. However, other analysts such as the Lowy Institute argue that the BRI is not the main cause of failed projects, while the Rhodium Group found that "asset seizures are a very rare occurrence", while debt write-off is the most common outcome.

Sovereignty slicing 
Some governments have accused the Belt and Road Initiative of being "neocolonial" due to what they allege is China's practice of debt trap diplomacy to fund the initiative's infrastructure projects in Pakistan, Sri Lanka and the Maldives. China contends that the initiative has provided markets for commodities, improved prices of resources and thereby reduced inequalities in exchange, improved infrastructure, created employment, stimulated industrialization, and expanded technology transfer, thereby benefiting host countries.

Allegations of technology theft 

China is accused by critics of the theft of "cutting-edge technology from global leaders in diverse fields". China is said to have begun a widespread effort to acquire U.S. military technology and classified information and the trade secrets of U.S. companies. China is accused of stealing trade secrets and technology, often from companies in the United States, to help support its long-term military and commercial development. China has been accused of using a number of methods to obtain U.S. technology, using lawful methods, as well as covert methods, such as espionage, leveraging a network of scientific, academic and business contacts.

The German Federal Ministry of the Interior estimates that Chinese economic espionage could be costing Germany between 20 and 50 billion euros annually. Spies are reportedly targeting mid- and small-scale companies that do not have as strong security regimens as larger corporations.

Lobbying and influence operations 

China is accused of nominating persons to various organizations with the view of influencing the organizational culture and values to the advantage of China's national interests. Examples cited include the promotion of Chinese officials to the UN Food and Agriculture Organization, which critics have claimed advances Chinese national interests. The Confucius Institutes have also been claimed to advance Chinese state interests. China is alleged to have attempted foreign electoral intervention in the domestic political elections of other nations, including in the United States, although these claims have not been supported by evidence., China has been accused of interference in elections on Taiwan, and has been accused of influencing Australian members of Parliament.

Relations between China and Australia deteriorated after 2018 due to growing concerns of Chinese political influence in various sectors of Australian society including in the Government, universities and media as well as China's stance on the South China Sea dispute. Consequently, Australian Coalition Government announced plans to ban foreign donations to Australian political parties and activist groups. Australia has empowered the Australian Security Intelligence Organisation, Australian Federal Police (AFP) and the Attorney-General’s Department to target the China-linked entities and people under new legislation to combat alleged Chinese influence operations, including the alleged deployment of the United Front Work Department of the Chinese Communist Party (CCP). 

The United Work Front department is accused of lobbying policy makers outside of China to enact pro-CCP policies, targeting people or entities that are outside the Party proper, especially in the overseas Chinese community, who hold social, commercial, or academic influence, or who represent interest groups. Through its efforts, the UFWD seeks to ensure that these individuals and groups are supportive of or useful to CCP interests and potential critics remain divided.

In 2005, a pair of Chinese dissidents claimed that China may have up to 1,000 intelligence agents in Canada. The head of the Canadian Security Intelligence Service Richard Fadden in a television interview implied that various Canadian politicians at provincial and municipal levels had ties to Chinese intelligence, a statement which he withdrew few days later.

Usage of the phrase 

 In 1996, a United States Institute of Peace report on the South China Sea dispute writes "[…] analysts point to Chinese “salami tactics,” in which China tests the other claimants through aggressive actions, then backs off when it meets significant resistance."
In 2001, Jasjit Singh, ISDA, wrote "Salami-slicing of the adversary's territory where each slice does not attract a major response, and yet the process over a time would result in gains of territory. China's strategy of salami slicing during the 1950s on our northern frontiers [...]".
In 2012, Robbert Haddick described "salami-slicing," as "the slow accumulation of small actions, none of which is a casus belli, but which add up over time to a major strategic change [...] The goal of Beijing’s salami-slicing would be to gradually accumulate, through small but persistent acts, evidence of China’s enduring presence in its claimed territory [...]."
In December 2013, Erik Voeten wrote in a Washington Post article concerning China's salami-tactics with reference to "extension of its air defense zone over the East China Sea" – "The key to salami tactics’ effectiveness is that the individual transgressions are small enough not to evoke a response"– going on to ask, "So how should the United States respond in this case?"
In January 2014, Bonnie S. Glaser, a China expert in the Center for Strategic and International Studies, made a statement before the US House Armed Services Subcommittee on Seapower and Projection Forces and the House Foreign Affairs Subcommittee on Asia Pacific, "How the US responds to China’s growing propensity to use coercion, bullying and salami-slicing tactics to secure its maritime interests is increasingly viewed as the key measure of success of the US rebalance to Asia. [...] China thus seeks to employ a charm offensive with the majority of its neighbors while continuing its salami-slicing tactics to advance its territorial and maritime claims and pressing its interpretation of permissible military activities in its EEZ."
In March 2014, Darshana M. Baruah, a Junior Fellow at ORF and a nonresident scholar at the Carnegie Endowment for International Peace, wrote "As Beijing's 'salami slicing' strategy is gathering speed it is more important than ever for ASEAN to show it solidarity and stand up to its bigger neighbour, China."
In India in 2017, the Chief of the Army Staff General Bipin Rawat used the phrase in a statement, "As far as northern adversary is concerned, the flexing of muscle has started. The salami slicing, taking over territory in a very gradual manner, testing our limits of threshold is something we have to be wary about and remain prepared for situations emerging which could gradually emerge into conflict."

Critique 

Crispin Rovere, while agreeing that China's strategy is widely accepted as salami slicing approach, also counters that China's strategy is based on the ancient Chinese game of "Go" in which enemy territory is gradually surrounded until enemy is overpowered, whereas American strategy is based on the game of poker played with straight face in an ambiguous situation, and Russian strategy is based on the game of chess which is similar to salami slicing in terms of gaining strategic advantage through a series of smaller set of actions.

In 2019, only in the limited context of Sino-Indian border dispute according to retired Indian Lieutenant General H. S. Panag, the phrase 'salami slicing' that is used "by military scholars as well as Army Chief General Bipin Rawat in relation to the Line of Actual Control — is a misnomer". General Panag argues that whatever territory China needed to annex, was done prior to 1962 and after 1962, while there has been territorial claims by China, this is done more to "embarrass" rather than a form of "permanent salami slicing".

Linda Jakobson has argued that rather than salami slicing based territorial expansion and decision making, "China's decision-making can be explained by bureaucratic competition between China's various maritime agencies." Bonnie S. Glaser argues against this view point, saying "bureaucratic competition among numerous maritime actors [...] is probably not the biggest source of instability. Rather, China's determination to advance its sovereignty claims and expand its control over the South China Sea is the primary challenge."

References

Notelist

Citations

Further reading
 Ronak Gopaldas (3 October 2018). China’s salami slicing takes root in Africa. Institute for Security Studies Africa.
 Brahma Chellaney (24 December 2013). The Chinese art of creeping warfare. Livemint

People's Republic of China
Geopolitical rivalry